Yazeed Mohamed Al-Rajhi (born 30 September 1981 in Riyadh) is a Saudi businessman, entrepreneur, and business magnate. One of the sons of businessman Sheikh Muhammad bin Abdulaziz Al-Rajhi. His origins trace back to the Al-Qassim region (Al-Bukayriyah), and his lineage traces back to the Bani Zaid tribe. He was born and raised in Riyadh. He began his working life at an early age when his father appointed him in 1998 as an observer of the Private Property Office and later became its general manager throughout the Kingdom in 2004, after which he rose to a number of high positions until he became one of the well-known businessmen.

At the same time, Yazeed is a Rally driver who has been competing in the World Rally Championship and other international rally events since 2007. He participated in the Cross-Country Rallies and his debutant at Dakar Rally was in 2015.

In 2007, Yazeed established his own racing team. It was known as Al-Rajhi Racing Team and later renamed to Yazeed Racing Team where he started his first unofficial competition in the Middle East Rally Championship (MERC), the 2007 Jordan Rally in order to gain experience so he can formally participate in different Rally Championships in future. After that he scored his first ever points (eighth place) in Greek's 2012 Acropolis Rally in the 40th season of the World Rally Championship (WRC).

Nicknamed the Black Horse, Al Rajhi made his WRC debut at 2008 Rally Argentina with Subaru Impreza WRX STI officially. In 2008 Jordan Rally – was his other WRC appearance of the year. He returned to the top level in 2010, finishing 13th overall on the Jordan Rally in a Peugeot 207 S2000. He also contested that year's Rally d'Italia Sardegna, a round of the Intercontinental Rally Challenge, but he retired after losing a wheel. In 2011 he contested seven WRC rounds, but retired from six of them. He also competed in the 2011 Tour de Corse, finishing 14th. The Saudi won the Silk Way Rally in 2018. In 2019 Al Rajhi won the first edition of Saudi Desert Rally Championship. Yazeed occupied the top positions in Dakar 2020 with best finish in fourth place. Moving to the new year, the Saudi motorsport icon left a historical imprint in the second edition of the Dakar Rally in Saudi Arabia after winning two stages in Dakar Rally 2021 in his Toyota Hilux and became the first Saudi and Arab to win on home soil in his class and the youngest contestant to win a stage from Dakar that year.

Business career 
Yazeed Al-Rajhi started his business career at an early age:

 [1998 – 2000] Appointed by his father, Sheikh Mohammed bin Abdulaziz Al-Rajhi, as an observer of his private property office (real estate)
 [2001– 2003] Appointed as Director of the Private Property Office (Real Estate)
 [2004 – 2007] Appointed as the general manager for all offices of Sheikh Mohammed bin Abdulaziz Al-Rajhi properties throughout the Kingdom
 [2006 – 2007] General Manager of the Mohammed bin Abdulaziz Al-Rajhi Corporation for Trade and Agriculture, in addition to managing his father's real estate properties.
 [2010 – present] CEO of Yazeed Al-Rajhi & Brothers Holding Company

Board Chairs 

 Chairman of the Board of Directors of Mohammed Abdul Aziz Al-Rajhi & Sons Investment Company
 Chairman of the Board of Directors of Yazeed Al-Rajhi & Brothers Holding Company

Active Board Member 

 Vice Chairman of the Board of Directors of Al-Rajhi Steel
 Vice Chairman of the Board of Directors of the International Beverages Company
 Member of the Board of Directors of Jazan Development Company
 Vice Chairman of the Investment Committee of Manafea Holding Company
 Member of the Board of Directors of Endowments of Sheikh Mohammed bin Abdulaziz Al-Rajhi
 Member of the General Endowment of Sheikh Mohammed bin Abdulaziz Al-Rajhi
 Member of the Board of Directors of the Atomic Endowment of Sheikh Mohammed bin Abdulaziz Al-Rajhi
 Member of the Board of Directors of the Holy Qur’an Memorization Association in Al Bukayriyah Governorate

Yazeed Al Rajhi Personal Titles 
The first Saudi to be selected in 2008 by the Unicef as the Goodwill ambassador in Saudi Arabia and the Gulf, for one year
The first Saudi to be appointed as a 'Donate Life' ambassador in 2009
In 2009 he got the title of 'Gentleman' by Rotana magazines readers' popular
In 2008 he came in third position in the Mobily and Riyadiah 'Most Distinguished Athlete in Saudi Arabia ' competition
Received the title of ambassador for fighting drugs in Saudi Arabia
The best upcoming competitor in the third round of the World Rally Competition taking place in Jordon – 2010

Results of 2023

Results of 2022

Best Results of 2021

Best Results of 2020

Best Results 2019

Best Results 2018

Best Results 2017

Best Results 2016 

 Third Overall in Cross Country Championship – CCR (2016)

Best Results 2015 

 Third Overall in Cross Country Championship – CCR (2015)
 Al Rajhi made his debut in Dakar.

Best Results 2014 

 Third Overall in Cross Country Championship – CCR.

Best Results 2013 

 Fifth Overall in World Rally Championship WRC2.
 Fifth Overall in Middle East Rally Championship MERS.

Best Results 2012 

 Third Overall in World Rally Championship WRC2.

Best Results 2011

Best Results 2010

Best Results 2009 

 Third Overall in MERC.

Best Results 2008

Victories of Saudi Arabia Motor Federation (SAMF)

Career results

Complete World Rally Championship results
 
* Season still in progress.

SWRC results

WRC-2 results

WRC-Trophy results

ERC results

Dakar Rally results

References

External links

 Official website

Living people
1981 births
Saudi Arabian rally drivers
World Rally Championship drivers
Intercontinental Rally Challenge drivers
People from Al-Qassim Province
Saudi Arabian motorsport people
Dakar Rally drivers
European Rally Championship drivers
Toyota Gazoo Racing drivers